Jordan Asher Cruz, better known as Boots (stylized as BOOTS), is an American record producer, singer, rapper, director, animator and songwriter. He first gained recognition in 2013 for his significant contributions to American singer-songwriter Beyoncé's critically acclaimed self-titled fifth studio album. He has been nominated for the Grammy Award for Album of the Year twice.

Career

Early career and Beyoncé
Jordan Asher Cruz was a member of bands such as Young Circles, Blonds and Stonefox. In June 2013, he was officially signed to rapper Jay-Z's entertainment company and Sony Music Entertainment imprint, Roc Nation, under the pseudonym Boots, for publishing. In the same month, a fashion film (starring Chanel Iman and Viktoriya Sasonkina) featuring music by Boots was released.

With his contributions to Beyoncé's self-titled fifth studio album, released in December 2013, Boots came onto the music scene largely unknown. Upon the release of Beyoncé, he updated his Facebook page, saying he had been "working on [Beyoncé] for most of the past year", and that he had "produced 85% of [the album] and [had] four original songs on the album". Boots contributed additional production, background vocals and instruments to the album's first R&B/hip hop single, "Drunk in Love", featuring Jay-Z. Beyoncé later referenced Boots' work on the album, saying he is "a new producer that [she] completely respect[s]", that "he is an innovator", and she is "so proud to work with him".

In an interview with The New York Times, Boots would not speak of his previous projects or how Beyoncé found his demo, only confirming he signed a publishing deal with Roc Nation in June 2013. A last-ditch bout of songwriting yielded “I'm On To You”, a moody minor-key song with layers of eerie background voices and a particular rhythmic undertow. He saw it as a template for a solo album. “That song was my heart,” he said. At his first meeting with Beyoncé, he had already written songs he believed would resonate with her, but she was more enthused by his experimental material. Beyoncé refused to leave the song alone, saying to Boots, "This shit has to knock harder than any rap album out there." The song became "Haunted", and the previous title "I'm On To You" was instead recorded as a phrase in the song's refrain.

Following an infuriating meeting with a record label, Boots wrote the stream of consciousness rap from "Ghost" and played it for Beyoncé in the early stages of recording. She identified with its content as she had similar experiences from signing a recording contract at a young age. Boots made the song in a hypnotic state, saying, "I started with guitars, just building the layers until they resembled Aphex Twin soundscapes. And then I completely contained them within the beat".

Solo releases
On February 13, 2014 Beyoncé's official Facebook page shared a link to Boots' personal website which contained an original composition titled "Dust" with an accompanying music video. The song was of the first to be released which featured Boots singing lead vocals.

On April 11, 2014 Boots uploaded a photo to his Twitter reportedly of a track list. The track list contained all of the songs he had previously released. Prominent features listed were Shlohmo & Jeremih, Kelela as previously mentioned, Son Lux, Margot and a final feature that is unconfirmed. He later went on to announce that the track list was a mixtape titled "WinterSpringSummerFall" but did not confirm a release date. In July 2014, Boots scored the trailer of 2015 film Fifty Shades of Grey using a slowed-down version of "Crazy in Love" by Beyoncé who re-recorded the song and string arrangements by Margot. On September 8, 2014, he released his first single, "Mercy", on his SoundCloud account and on iTunes. On September 11, 2014, he released a video for "Mercy", directed by himself On October 31, 2014, Boots performed "Early" with Run The Jewels on the Late Show with David Letterman. On November 6, Boots released the new song "I Run Roulette.".

Motorcycle Jesus and AQUΛRIA
On February 19, 2015 Nowness premiered a trailer for a post-apocalyptic film titled Motorcycle Jesus, which was written and directed by Boots, which featured five original songs. In an exclusive feature story with Jon Pareles for The New York Times it was revealed that Boots would be releasing a solo album "later this year". The interview also revealed that Boots had produced unreleased albums for British singer FKA Twigs and Autolux. On March 18, 2015, Boots performed "I Run Roulette" on The Tonight Show Starring Jimmy Fallon. The performance—which featured Boots, two drummers, and a light show—garnered rave reviews from critics. On November 10, 2015, Adult Swim & Toonami premiered the animated video for Boots' single "C.U.R.E.". Boots would go on to perform "C.U.R.E." on The Late Show With Stephen Colbert.

13Lux Films
In early 2017, Cruz started production on animated series, where he serves as creator, director, writer, animator, and show runner. 

Cruz would subsequently go on to write and develop more film and television projects with his production company, 13Lux Films. 
In 2021, Cruz wrote, directed and produced along with Jennifer Goodridge Cruz, animated short film "No Future Here" which premiered at HollyShorts Film Festival on September 24, 2021 in Los Angeles, CA at the Grauman's Chinese Theatre. "No Future Here" features voices by Cleopatra Coleman of The Last Man on Earth, Frankie Loyal of Mayans M.C. and Justin Warfield of She Wants Revenge. "No Future Here" was also an official selection at Sidewalk Film Festival in Birmingham, Alabama and New York Shorts International Film Festival at Village East Cinema in New York City. The short would go on to win Best Animation at the 2022 Bowery Film Festival.

Discography

Studio albums

Extended plays

Mixtapes

Guest appearances
2014: "Early" (with Run the Jewels) on Run the Jewels 2
2017: "2100" (with Run the Jewels) on Run the Jewels 3

Songwriting, production, and miscellaneous credits

Awards and nominations

Grammy Awards

References

External links
 

Living people
Record producers from Florida
Place of birth missing (living people)
Year of birth missing (living people)
American male singers
Songwriters from Florida
American male songwriters